Taylor Grado (born June 2, 1996) is an American professional wrestler signed to WWE, where she performs on the NXT brand under the ring name Jacy Jayne as a former member of Toxic Attraction. She is a former record-tying two-time NXT Women's Tag Team Champion alongside stablemate Gigi Dolin. Grado began her career under the name Avery Taylor, and had previously performed World Xtreme Wrestling (WXW).

Professional wrestling career

Early career (2018–2020)
Grado began her career training at World Wrestling Academy in New Port Richy Florida. After 4 months of training, she already began working shows. Under the ring name Avery Taylor, Grado made her wrestling debut around May 30, 2018 in American Combat Wrestling (ACW). She went on to establish a career in the Florida wrestling promotions including ACW, Shine Wrestling, Evolve and Full Impact Pro. She became a three-time Women's Champion including two women's title reigns in American Combat Wrestling and a single women's title reign in World Xtreme Wrestling.

WWE (2020–present)

Toxic Attraction (2020–2023) 

Grado made her televised debut on the September 23, 2020 episode of NXT during which she competed in a Number One Contender Battle Royal won by Candice LeRae. It was reported as early as February 24, 2021, Grado signed with WWE. She made her debut under the new name Jacy Jayne on the July 20 episode of NXT in a match lost against Franky Monet.

On the debut episode of NXT 2.0 on September 14, Jayne and Gigi Dolin faced Carter and Catanzaro in a tag-team match, which ended in no contest after Mandy Rose interfered, during which she debuted a new dark-haired look, and they subsequently wrestled Carter, Catanzaro and Sarray in a six-woman tag team match, in which Rose, Dolin and Jayne emerged victorious. She quickly joined the women's stable Toxic Attraction led by Mandy Rose in 2021, thus establishing herself as a heel in the process. During the September 28 episode of NXT 2.0, the group was represented in their first in-ring match by Gigi Dolin and Jayne, in a NXT Women's Tag Team title match won by Io Shirai & Zoey Stark. At NXT: Halloween Havoc, Dolin and Jayne defeated Shirai and Stark, and Indi Hartwell and Persia Pirotta in a Scareway to Hell Ladder triple threat tag team match for the NXT Women's Tag Team Championship, marking the first championships for both Dolin and Jayne in the company.

On the November 16 episode of NXT 2.0, Jayne joined Gigi Dolin, Mandy Rose and Dakota Kai in a WarGames match at NXT WarGames 2021 to face Raquel González, Kay Lee Ray, Cora Jade and Io Shirai.  At the event, Toxic Attraction and Dakota Kai were defeated by Team Raquel. On NXT Vengeance Day, Gigi and Jacy retained their NXT Women's Tag Team Championships against Indi Hartwell and Persia Pirotta.

On the NXT Stand & Deliver Kickoff, Dolin and Jayne lost the NXT Women's Tag Team Championship to Dakota Kai and Raquel González with the help from Wendy Choo's interference, ending their reign at 158 days. However, they regained the titles with the help of Mandy Rose's distraction three days later.

At NXT: The Great American Bash on July 5, 2022, Dolin and Jayne lost the NXT Women's Tag Team Championship to Roxanne Perez and Cora Jade. After the titles were vacated, Dolin and Jayne participated in a Fatal Four-Way Elimination Match on the August 2 episode of NXT 2.0, against Ivy Nile & Tatum Paxley, Yulisa Leon & Valentina Feroz, and Katana Chance and Kayden Carter. Dolin and Jayne were part of the final two teams in the match but eventually lost to Katana & Kayden.

On the August 19 episode of SmackDown, Jayne made her main roster debut alongside Dolin as participants in the WWE Women's Tag Team Championship Tournament. They would win the first match but were forced out of the tournament due to an injury suffered by Dolin. Dolin and Jayne made their return to SmackDown in a losing effort against new WWE Women's Tag Team Champions Aliyah and Raquel Rodriguez. At NXT: New Year's Evil on January 10, 2023, Dolin and Jayne were declared co-winners of a 20-woman battle royal after eliminating each other simultaneously, earning an NXT Women's Championship match against Roxanne Perez in a triple threat match at NXT Vengeance Day, where Perez successfully retained her title.

Singles run (2023–present) 
On the February 7, 2023, edition of NXT, during a Ding Dong, Hello! segment hosted by Bayley, Jayne turned on Dolin, ending Toxic Attraction. Jayne faced Dolin at NXT Roadblock on March 7 with Dolin winning the match.

Championships and accomplishments

American Combat Wrestling
ACW Women's Championship (2 times)
ACW Women's Title #1 Contendership Tournament (2018)
 Pro Wrestling Illustrated
 Ranked No. 49 of the top 150 female singles wrestlers in the PWI Women's 150 in 2022
 Ranked No. 14 of the top 100 Tag Teams in the PWI Tag Team 100 in 2022 – with Toxic Attraction
World Xtreme Wrestling
WXW Women's Championship (1 time)
 WWE
NXT Women's Tag Team Championship (2 times) – with Gigi Dolin

References

External links 
 
 
 
 

1996 births
Living people
Sportspeople from Tampa, Florida
American female professional wrestlers
Professional wrestlers from Florida
21st-century American women
21st-century professional wrestlers
NXT Women's Tag Team Champions